In economics, time preference (or time discounting, delay discounting, temporal discounting, long-term orientation) is the current relative valuation placed on receiving a good or some cash at an earlier date compared with receiving it at a later date.

Time preferences are captured mathematically in the discount function. The higher the time preference, the higher the discount placed on returns receivable or costs payable in the future.

One of the factors that may determine an individual's time preference is how long that individual has lived. An older individual may have a lower time preference (relative to what they had earlier in life) due to a higher income and to the fact that they have had more time to acquire durable commodities (such as a college education or a house).

Example
A practical example: Jim and Bob go out for a drink but  Jim has no money so Bob lends Jim $10. The next day Jim visits Bob and says, "Bob, you can have $10 now, or I will give you $15 when I get paid at the end of the month." Bob's time preference will change depending on his trust in Jim, whether he needs the money now, or if he thinks he can wait; or if he'd prefer to have $15 at the end of the month rather than $10 now. Present and expected needs, present and expected income affect one's time preference.

Neoclassical views
In the neoclassical theory of interest due to Irving Fisher, the rate of time preference is usually taken as a parameter in an individual's utility function which captures the trade off between consumption today and consumption in the future, and is thus exogenous and subjective. It is also the underlying determinant of the real rate of interest. The rate of return on investment is generally seen as return on capital, with the real rate of interest equal to the marginal product of capital at any point in time. Arbitrage, in turn, implies that the return on capital is equalized with the interest rate on financial assets (adjusting for factors such as inflation and risk). Consumers, who are facing a choice between consumption and saving, respond to the difference between the market interest rate and their own subjective rate of time preference ("impatience") and increase or decrease their current consumption according to this difference. This changes the amount of funds available for investment and capital accumulation, as in for example the Ramsey growth model.

In the long run steady state, consumption's share in a person's income is constant which pins down the rate of interest as equal to the rate of time preference, with the marginal product of capital adjusting to ensure this equality holds. It is important to note that in this view, it is not that people discount the future because they can receive positive interest rates on their savings. Rather, the causality goes in the opposite direction; interest rates must be positive in order to induce impatient individuals to forgo current consumptions in favor of future.

Austrian Economics 
Time preference is a key component of the Austrian School of economics, it is used to understand the relationship between saving, investment and interest rates. According to the Misesian branch of the school: In acting,  an actor invariably aims to substitute a more satisfactory for a less satisfactory state of affairs and thus demonstrates a preference for more rather than fewer goods. Moreover, he invariably consider when in the future his goals will be reached, i.e., the time necessary to accomplish them, as well as a good's duration of serviceability. Thus, he also demonstrates a universal preference for earlier over later goods, and for more over less durable ones. This is the phenomenon of time preference. Every actor requires some amount of time to attain his goal, and since man must always consume something and cannot entirely stop consuming while he is alive, time is always scarce. Thus, ceteris paribus, present or earlier goods are, and must invariably be, valued more highly than future or later ones. In fact, if man were not constrained by time preference and if the only constraint operating on him were that of preferring more over less, he would invariably choose those production processes which yielded the largest output per input, regardless of the length of time needed for these methods to bear fruit.

To enjoy greater consumption, man must extend his productivity first. Since acquiring the increased productivity comes with a cost—namely, time spent away from using the old method of production and consumption—there must be some means of paying that cost. This is the role of savings. Some people have refrained from consumption in the past so that others can be sustained and create the new structure.

Savings remain key to this process of capital construction, and it is the time preference, that manifests itself in savings. Time preference is the extent to which people value current consumption over future consumption. If people enjoy current consumption so much, that the promise of an increased future consumption cannot bring them to save (and sacrifice the current level of consumption), the production will not be improved.

The thrust of the Austrian Business Cycle Theory is that credit inflation distorts this process, by making it appear that more means exist for current production than are actually sustainable. Since this is in fact an illusion, the endeavors of entrepreneurs to create a structure of production not reflecting actual consumer time preferences (as manifested in available savings for the purchase of producer goods) must end in failure.

Time-Preference Theory of Interest

The Austrian school rejects the classical view of capital, which says interest rates are determined by the supply and demand of capital. The Austrian school holds that interest rates are determined by the subjective decision of individuals to spend money now or in the future. In other words, interest rates are determined by the time preference of borrowers and lenders. For example, an increase in the rate of saving suggests that consumers are putting off present consumption and that more resources (and money) will be available in the future.

Austrian economist Eugen von Böhm-Bawerk, who expounded on the theory in his book Capital and Interest, believes that the value of goods decreases as the length of time needed for their completion increases, even when their quantity, quality, and nature remain the same. Böhm-Bawerk names three reasons for the inherent difference in value between present and future goods: the tendency, in a healthy economy, for the supply of goods to grow over time; the tendency of consumers to underestimate their future needs; and the preference of entrepreneurs to initiate production with materials presently available, rather than waiting for future goods to appear.

Temporal discounting
Temporal discounting (also known as delay discounting, time discounting) is the tendency of people to discount rewards as they approach a temporal horizon in the future or the past (i.e., become so distant in time that they cease to be valuable or to have additive effects). To put it another way, it is a tendency to give greater value to rewards as they move away from their temporal horizons and towards the "now". For instance, a nicotine deprived smoker may highly value a cigarette available any time in the next 6 hours but assign little or no value to a cigarette available in 6 months.

Regarding terminology, from Frederick et al. (2002):

This term is used in intertemporal economics, intertemporal choice, neurobiology of reward and decision making, microeconomics and recently neuroeconomics. Traditional models of economics assumed that the discounting function is exponential in time leading to a monotonic decrease in preference with increased time delay; however, more recent neuroeconomic models suggest a hyperbolic discount function which can address the phenomenon of preference reversal.
Temporal discounting is also a theory particularly relevant to the political decisions of individuals, as people often put their short term political interests before the longer term policies. This can be applied to the way individuals vote in elections but can also apply to how they contribute to societal issues like climate change, that is primarily a long term threat and therefore not prioritised.

Assessing temporal discounting
Offered a choice of $100 today and $100 in one month, individuals will most likely choose the $100 now. However, should the question change to having $100 today, or $1,000 in one month, individuals will most likely choose the $1,000 in one month. The $100 can be conceptualized as a Smaller Sooner Reward (SSR), and the $1,000 can be conceptualized as a Larger Later Reward (LLR). Researchers who study temporal discounting are interested in the point in time in which an individual changes their preference for the SSR to the LLR, or vice versa. For example, although an individual may prefer $1,000 in one month over $100 now, they may switch their preference to the $100 if the delay to the $1,000 is increased to 60 months (5 years). This means that this individual values $1,000 after a delay of 60 months less than $100 now. The trick is to find the point in time in which the individual values the LLR and the SSR as being equivalent. That is known as the indifference point. Preferences can be measured by asking people to make a series of choices between immediate and delayed payoffs, where the delay period and the payoff amounts are varied.

Origin of differences in time preference across countries
Oded Galor and Omer Ozak explore the roots of observed differences in time preference across nations. They establish that pre-industrial agricultural characteristics that were favorable to higher return to agricultural investment triggered a process of selection, adaptation, and learning that brought about a higher prevalence of long-term orientation. These agricultural characteristics are associated with contemporary economic and human behavior such as technological adoption, education, saving, and smoking.

Historical understanding of time preference theory in relation to interest rates

The Catholic scholastic philosophers firstly brought up sophisticated explanations and justifications of return on capital, including risk and the opportunity cost of profit forgone, associated with the discount factor. However, they failed to interpret the interest on a riskless loan and hence denounced the time preference discounter as sinful and usurious.

Later, Conrad Summenhart, a theologian at the University of Tübingen, used time preference to explain the discount loans, where the lenders won't profit usuriously from the loans as the borrowers would accept the price the lenders ask. A half-century later, Martin de Azpilcueta Navarrus, a Dominican canon lawyer and monetary theorist at the University of Salamanca, held the view that present goods, such as money, will naturally be worth more on the market than future goods (money). At about the same time, Gian Francesco Lottini da Volterra, an Italian humanist and politician, discovered time preference and contemplated time preference as an overestimation of "a present" that can be grasped immediately by the senses. Two centuries later, Ferdinando Galiani, a Neapolitan abbot, used an analogy to point out that just similar to the exchange rate, the interest rate links and equates the present value to the future value, and under people's subjective mind, these two physically non-identical items should be equal.

These scattered thoughts and progression of theories inspired Anne Robert Jacques Turgot, a French statesman, to generate a full-scale time preference theory: what must be compared in a loan transaction is not the value of money lent with the value repaid, but rather the ‘value of the promise of a sum of money compared to the value of money available now; in addition, he analyzed the relation between money supply and interest rates: If money supply increases and people with insensitive time preference receive the money, then these people tend to hoard money for savings instead of going for consumptions, which will cause interest rates to fall while prices to rise. This helps to explain why contemporary interest rates have tended to fall due to the European thrifty spirit.

See also
 Decision theory
 Delayed gratification
 Discount function
 Discounted utility
 Discounting
 Dynamic inconsistency
 Hofstede's cultural dimensions theory – A theory of cultural differences in time preference
 Hyperbolic discounting – A model of typical time preferences.
 Intertemporal choice
 Net present value
 Time value of money
 Treasury test discount rate

Notes

Intertemporal economics
Interest rates